Ingleside Vineyards is a winery located in the Northern Neck George Washington Birthplace AVA, an American Viticultural Area located in the Northern Neck region of Virginia. Ingleside is one of the oldest and largest wineries in the state, established in 1980, and part of an estate of over  owned by the Flemer family since 1890.

History
The farmhouse, originally known as Washington Academy, was built in 1834, and is a two-story, five-bay, brick building with a pedimented hexastyle front portico. Flanking the two-story central block are one-story wings.  The Washington Academy operated until about 1844, and the property sold in 1847.

It was listed on the National Register of Historic Places in 1979.  The vineyard also owns two nearby Register-listed houses, Wirtland and Roxbury.

Relationship with Mark Warner
Former Virginia governor and current United States Senator Mark Warner grows  of grapes for Ingleside Vineyards at his farm in King George County. Ingleside bottles a private label which Warner offers at charity auctions.

Wines
Among the wines that Ingleside Vineyards produces are varietal and blended bottlings of Sangiovese, Petit Verdot, Merlot, Cabernet Sauvignon, Cabernet Franc and Touriga Nacional.

References

External links
Official website

Houses on the National Register of Historic Places in Virginia
Houses completed in 1834
Houses in Westmoreland County, Virginia
National Register of Historic Places in Westmoreland County, Virginia
Wineries in Virginia
Tourist attractions in Westmoreland County, Virginia